Enteromius tiekoroi is a species of ray-finned fish in the genus Enteromius, it is found in Guinea and Sierra Leone.

References 

 

Enteromius
Taxa named by Christian Lévêque
Taxa named by Guy G. Teugels
Taxa named by Thys van den Audenaerde
Fish described in 1987